Festuca hystrix is a species of grass in the family Poaceae.

References

hystrix
Taxa named by Pierre Edmond Boissier
Plants described in 1838
Flora of Morocco
Flora of Spain